Chengdu JinXi Cultural Media and Production Company, headquartered in Chengdu, China, is an organization that focuses on planning, production, distribution and investment of films and television dramas. The production team of the company has participated in the planning, production and operation of some very popular films and TV dramas projects in China, including Speed Angels, No Limit, Stagnant Water with Ripples, Bashan’s Guerrilla Team and The Story of Granny Liu.

In June 2014, the company announced the investment of 80 million RMB in the production of Chu Kui Men (Leaving the Gorge of Kuimen). The company is also actively engaged in development, production and promotion services for various new media products. The company is planning to produce a series of short films in 2015, which is called SiChuan Anecdotes and will be the first short films series in China exclusively developed for mobile platforms.

Its parent company, the Sichuan Social Credit Fund is the first private equity fund company that established in Chengdu, the most important economic, cultural and high-tech industrial city in Southwest China. The Fund Company currently has about 2 billion RMB of assets under its management and expects to manage more than 10 billion RMB of asset in 5 years. It is specialized in the investment of high-tech, biomedical, environmental and movie/television industries. Being one of the primary funds managed by the Fund company, JinXi Social Credit Cultural Industry Fund focus on the investment of films and television dramas productions, cultural development and new media developments. The management team of the fund has made successful investment in some popular movie and television drama projects in China, including Speed Angels, No Limit and Stagnant Water with Ripples, etc.

References

 

Film production companies of China
Television production companies of China
Companies based in Chengdu